George Richard Durgan (January 20, 1872 – January 13, 1942) was a U.S. Representative from Indiana from 1933 to 1935.

Biography 
Born in Westpoint, Indiana, Durgan attended the village school there. He moved to Lafayette, Indiana, in 1892 and was employed as a clerk and later as a traveling salesman. He engaged in mercantile pursuits. He served as mayor of Lafayette in 1904–1913 and 1917–1925 and he served as delegate to the Democratic National Convention in 1912.

Congress 
Durgan was elected as a Democrat to the 73rd Congress (March 4, 1933 – January 3, 1935). He was an unsuccessful candidate for reelection in 1934 to the 74th Congress.

Later career and death 
He resumed mercantile pursuits. He was appointed to the Indiana Public Service Commission in 1941 and moved to Indianapolis, Indiana. He died in Indianapolis on January 13, 1942, and was interred in Springvale Cemetery in Lafayette.

The former Durgan elementary school in the Lafayette School Corporation was named in his honor.

References

1872 births
1942 deaths
Mayors of Lafayette, Indiana
Democratic Party members of the United States House of Representatives from Indiana